This is a list of earthquakes in 1961. Only magnitude 6.0 or greater earthquakes appear on the list. Lower magnitude events are included if they have caused death, injury or damage. Events which occurred in remote areas will be excluded from the list as they wouldn't have generated significant media interest. All dates are listed according to UTC time. A fairly busy year although the largest event was only a magnitude 7.6. This was a big contrast to 1960 which had three events above magnitude 8. Peru had the largest event. Japan had five magnitude 7.0+ events. Overall there was not a great deal of deaths with the total being 128. Iran had the most with 60 from an event in June.

Overall

By death toll 

 Note: At least 10 casualties

By magnitude 

 Note: At least 7.0 magnitude

Notable events

January

February

March

April

May

June

July

August

September

October

November

December

References

1961
 
1961